The Governorate General of Brazil (Governo-Geral do Brasil) was a colonial administration of the Portuguese Empire in present-day Brazil. A governorate was equivalent in status to a viceroyalty, though the title viceroy didn't come into use until the early 18th century.  They were ruled by a Governor General who reported to the Crown.  The Governor General had direct authority over the constituent royal captaincies, and nominal but ill-defined authority over the donatary captaincies.  One captaincy, that of Duarte Coelho in Pernambuco, was exempt by royal decree from the authority of the Governors General.

History 

In 1549, in order to solve the governance problem of his South American colonies, King John III of Portugal established the Governorate General of Brazil. The governorate united the fifteen original donatary captaincy colonies some of which had reverted to the Crown, and others of which had been abandoned, into a single colony, but each captaincy would continue to exist as a provincial administrative unit of the governorate. For two brief periods from 1572–78 and 1607–13, the Governorate General of Brazil was partitioned into the Governorate General of Rio de Janeiro in the south, and the Governorate General of Bahia in the north.

In 1621, the Governorate General of Brazil was partitioned into two colonies, the State of Brazil and the State of Maranhão.

Composition 

From the original captaincies, additional donatary captaincies were carved out.

Captaincies created under the governorates 
Captaincy of Paraíba
Captaincy of Rio Grande de Norte
Captaincy of Cabo Frio
Captaincy of Paraguacu
Captaincy of Itaparica and Itamarandiba

The northern section of the captaincy of Sao Vicente was renamed to Captaincy of Rio de Janeiro.

List of governors-general

References

External links

Brazil
Colonial Brazil
Portuguese colonization of the Americas
Brazil
Former subdivisions of Brazil
Brazil
1549 establishments in Brazil
1572 disestablishments in Brazil
1578 establishments in Brazil
1607 disestablishments in Brazil
1613 establishments in Brazil
1621 disestablishments in Brazil
History of Bahia